Jihozápad (Southwest) is statistical area of the Nomenclature of Territorial Units for Statistics, level NUTS 2. It includes the Plzeň Region and the South Bohemian Region.

It covers an area of 17 617 km2 and 1,214,450 inhabitants (population density 67 inhabitants/km2).

Economy 
The Gross domestic product (GDP) of the region was 20.6 billion € in 2018, accounting for 9.9% of Czech economic output. GDP per capita adjusted for purchasing power was 23,600 € or 78% of the EU27 average in the same year. The GDP per employee was also 75% of the EU average.

References

See also
NUTS of the Czech Republic

NUTS 2 statistical regions of the European Union
Subdivisions of the Czech Republic